Clyde Bishop served in the California State Assembly for the 77th district from 1907 to 1907, got re-elected again serving from 1911 to 1913 and during the Spanish–American War he served in the United States Army.

References

American military personnel of the Spanish–American War
20th-century American politicians
Republican Party members of the California State Assembly
1874 births
1927 deaths
Politicians from Chicago